Aurora is a city in Marion County, Oregon, United States and is home to the nation's largest not-for-profit air ambulance company, Life Flight Network. Before being incorporated as a city, it was the location of the Aurora Colony, a religious commune founded in 1856 by William Keil and John E. Schmit. William named the settlement after his daughter. The population was 1,133 at the 2020 Census. It is part of the Salem Metropolitan Statistical Area.

Geography

The Pudding River flows northward, just east of Aurora.

Climate
This region experiences warm (but not hot) and dry summers, with no average monthly temperatures above .  According to the Köppen Climate Classification system, Aurora has a warm-summer Mediterranean climate, abbreviated "Csb" on climate maps.

Demographics

2020 census 
As of the census of 2020, there were 1,133 people, and 336 households in the city. There were 431 housing units. The makeup of the city was 79.3% White, 1.3% African American, 1.5% Native American, 0.9% Asian, 7.1% from other races, and 9.5% from two or more races. Hispanic or Latino of any race were 16.4% of the population.

There were 336 households, of which 28.5% had children under the age of 18 living with them, 66.1% were married couples living together, 17.6% had a female householder with no husband present, 14% had a male householder with no wife present, and 2.3% were cohabitating couple households. 31.5% had someone living alone who was 65 years of age or older. The average household size was 2.74 and the average family size was 3.00.

The median age in the city was 42.4 years. 6.7% of the residents were under the age of 5; 20.7% of residents were under the age of 18; and 17.1% were 65 years of age or older.

The median income for a household in the city was $90,357, which far exceeds the median income for a household in the State of Oregon of $65,667.

The poverty rate of all people in Aurora was 2.4%, which was lower than the poverty rate of all people in Oregon at 12.4%.

Demographics

2010 census
As of the census of 2010, there were 918 people, 336 households, and 256 families living in the city. The racial makeup of the city was 89.7% White, 0.5% African American, 0.9% Native American, 0.3% Asian, 6.3% from other races, and 2.3% from two or more races. Hispanic or Latino of any race were 10.9% of the population.

There were 336 households, of which 37.5% had children under the age of 18 living with them, 64.0% were married couples living together, 7.4% had a female householder with no husband present, 4.8% had a male householder with no wife present, and 23.8% were non-families. 18.5% of all households were made up of individuals, and 6.6% had someone living alone who was 65 years of age or older. The average household size was 2.73 and the average family size was 3.12.

The median age in the city was 39.6 years. 27.8% of residents were under the age of 18; 5.2% were between the ages of 18 and 24; 24.5% were from 25 to 44; 31.8% were from 45 to 64; and 10.8% were 65 years of age or older. The gender makeup of the city was 51.6% male and 48.4% female.

2000 census
As of the census of 2000, there were 655 people, 250 households, and 186 families living in the city. The population density was 1,441.8 people per square mile (562.0/km2). There were 262 housing units at an average density of 576.7 per square mile (224.8/km2). The racial makeup of the city was 94.20% White, 0.46% African American, 0.61% Native American, 1.07% Asian, 1.98% from other races, and 1.68% from two or more races. Hispanic or Latino of any race were 6.26% of the population.

There were 250 households, out of which 31.6% had children under the age of 18 living with them, 62.4% were married couples living together, 7.2% had a female householder with no husband present, and 25.6% were non-families. 19.6% of all households were made up of individuals, and 9.2% had someone living alone who was 65 years of age or older. The average household size was 2.62 and the average family size was 3.01.

In the city, the population was spread out, with 24.4% under the age of 18, 7.0% from 18 to 24, 27.8% from 25 to 44, 27.6% from 45 to 64, and 13.1% who were 65 years of age or older. The median age was 41 years. For every 100 females, there were 105.3 males. For every 100 females age 18 and over, there were 98.0 males.

The median income for a household in the city was $55,938, and the median income for a family was $65,556. Males had a median income of $45,938 versus $29,444 for females. The per capita income for the city was $24,839. None of the families and 1.6% of the population were living below the poverty line, including no under eighteens and 7.5% of those over 64.

Education
North Marion School District has a  school system with four schools within walking distance: North Marion Primary School, North Marion Intermediate School, North Marion Middle School, and North Marion High School.

Places of Interest
 Old Aurora Museum, about the Old Aurora Colony
 Aurora Mills Architectural Salvage, set in the town's historic seed cleaning mill complex built in 1890, it is now the town's largest antique shopping venue.
 Mainstreet Merchantile Antiques, one of the town's larger antique shops.

Transportation

Airport
The airport is owned by the State of Oregon and operated by the Oregon Department of Aviation.

Economy
Life Flight Network, the nation's largest not-for-profit air ambulance provider is headquartered at the Aurora State Airport. The company provides critical care transport from the scene of an emergency or from one hospital to another via helicopter and fixed-wing aircraft. They also provide emergent and non-emergent ground ambulance services. Life Flight Network has bases of operation throughout Oregon, Washington, Idaho, and Montana and has been saving lives in the region since 1978. The company employs approximately 900 people. Columbia Helicopters is also located in Aurora. The facility provides maintenance, repair, and overhaul services.

References

External links

 Entry for Aurora in the Oregon Blue Book

 
Cities in Oregon
Cities in Marion County, Oregon
Utopian communities in the United States
Populated places established in 1856
Salem, Oregon metropolitan area
1856 establishments in Oregon Territory